Joan Mary Cusack (born October 11, 1962) is an American actress. She received nominations for the Academy Award for Best Supporting Actress for her roles in the comedy-drama Working Girl (1988) and the romantic comedy In & Out (1997). Her other starring roles include those in Addams Family Values (1993), Runaway Bride (1999), School of Rock (2003), Ice Princess (2005), and Confessions of a Shopaholic (2009). She has also provided the voice of Jessie in the Toy Story franchise (1999–present) for which she won an Annie Award and Abby Mallard in Chicken Little (2005).

Cusack was a cast member on the comedy sketch show Saturday Night Live from 1985 to 1986. She starred on the Showtime hit drama/comedy series Shameless (2011–2021) as Sheila Jackson, a role for which she received five consecutive Primetime Emmy Award nominations, winning for the first time in 2015. She is the sister of actress Ann Cusack and actor John Cusack.

Early life
Cusack was born on October 11, 1962, in New York City and was raised in Evanston, Illinois. Her mother, Ann Paula "Nancy" Cusack (née Carolan; 1929–2022), was a former mathematics teacher and political activist. Her father, Dick Cusack (1925–2003), was an actor and filmmaker, and two of her four siblings, Ann (born 1961) and John (born 1966), are actors. Her family is of Irish Catholic descent. Cusack is an alumna of the University of Wisconsin–Madison (1984).

Career
Cusack has twice been nominated for an Academy Award for Best Supporting Actress for her work in Working Girl (1988) and In & Out (1997). She has appeared with her brother John in 10 movies: Class (1983), Sixteen Candles (1984), Grandview, U.S.A. (1984), Broadcast News (1987), Say Anything... (1989), Grosse Pointe Blank (1997), Cradle Will Rock (1999), High Fidelity (2000), Martian Child (2007), and War, Inc. (2008).

In the film Addams Family Values (1993), she played psychotic serial murderess Debbie Jellinsky, who marries and kills rich men. She also starred in the short-lived ABC sitcom What About Joan? in 2001 and the hit film Arlington Road (1999). For many years, Cusack was also the commercial spokeswoman for U.S. Cellular. One of Cusack's most well-known roles was the principal of Horace Green Elementary School, Rosalie 'Roz' Mullins, in School of Rock (2003). She also voiced Jessie in the Pixar hits Toy Story 2 (1999), Toy Story 3 (2010), and Toy Story 4 (2019), and played Dr. Burton, the therapist of Charlie (Logan Lerman), in the teen film The Perks of Being a Wallflower (2012). She also played Erin's mom in the final episode of NBC's The Office.

Cusack was a cast member on the NBC sketch show Saturday Night Live from 1985 to 1986. Her recurring characters on SNL included Salena, a socially inept girl who tries to ask out her boyfriend, Biff (played by Jon Lovitz), who is also socially inept. In addition, she did celebrity impersonations of Brooke Shields, Jane Fonda, and Queen Elizabeth II.

She has been nominated four times for the American Comedy Award in the category of Funniest Supporting Actress in a Motion Picture and has won three times, for Runaway Bride (1999), In & Out (1997), and Working Girl (1988). She has also won the New York Film Critics Circle Award and the Broadcast Film Critics Association Award for Best Supporting Actress for In & Out.

Cusack narrates the public-TV animated series Peep and the Big Wide World. In September 2010, Cusack guest-starred on NBC's Law & Order: SVU.

She also appeared as Justice Strauss in Netflix's adaptation of A Series of Unfortunate Events, which premiered in 2017. 

Cusack also appeared as the Tin Foil Lady in the Netflix movie Let It Snow, which was released in November 2019.

Shameless
In 2010, Cusack joined the Showtime drama/comedy Shameless as Sheila Jackson, the mother of Karen Jackson (Laura Slade Wiggins). The first season premiered on January 9, 2011, and had its first finale March 27, 2011. Cusack replaced actress Allison Janney, who portrayed the role in the first edit of the pilot episode. Janney took the role with the understanding the character would be less prominent on the show, but when producers decided to increase the character's screen presence, she was forced to pull out of the part to honor her series commitment on the ABC comedy Mr. Sunshine. Cusack has received critical acclaim for her performance, receiving Primetime Emmy Award for Outstanding Guest Actress in a Drama Series nominations in 2011, 2012, and 2013, as well as a nomination for the Primetime Emmy Award for Outstanding Guest Actress in a Comedy Series in 2014 and 2015, winning in the later year.

Personal life
Cusack married attorney Richard Burke, President and CEO of Envoy Global, Inc. in 1996. They have two sons: Dylan John (b. 1997) and Miles (b. 2000). She discovered she was pregnant with her first child on her first day of shooting the movie Mr. Wrong (1996). Cusack owns a home in Three Oaks Township, Michigan, and lives in Chicago, Illinois.

In 2003, both Joan and her brother John signed the "Not in My Name" resolution (along with people such as Noam Chomsky and Susan Sarandon) opposing the invasion of Iraq.

Since 2011, Cusack has owned Judy Maxwell Home, a gift shop in Old Town, Chicago. The shop is named for Barbra Streisand's character in What's Up Doc?, Cusack's favorite movie.

Filmography

Film

Television

Video games

Awards and nominations

References

External links

 
 
 
 Sac Ticket: Joan Cusack

1962 births
Living people
20th-century American actresses
21st-century American actresses
Actresses from Chicago
Actresses from New York City
American film actresses
American people of Irish descent
American television actresses
American video game actresses
American voice actresses
Annie Award winners
Cusack family (United States)
Primetime Emmy Award winners
University of Wisconsin–Madison alumni